Ijara Constituency is an electoral constituency in Kenya. It is one of six constituencies in Garissa County. It was the sole constituency in the former Ijara District. The constituency was established for the 1988 elections. The constituency has seven wards, all electing councillors for the Ijara County Council.

Members of Parliament

Wards

References 

Constituencies in Garissa County
Constituencies in North Eastern Province (Kenya)
1988 establishments in Kenya
Constituencies established in 1988